Jesse M. H. Graham (February 8, 1864July 25, 1930) was a teacher, newspaper editor,  postal worker, and state representative in Tennessee. A Republican, he was elected to represent Montgomery County, Tennessee in 1896 and was the only African American member of the legislature at the time. He was ousted over a residency requirement (he had lived in Louisville until October 1895). A note at the Tennessee State Library and Archives states, "According to several newspaper reports, the General Assembly soon [after] passed a bill blocking the election of black candidates."

See also
African Americans in Tennessee
African-American officeholders during and following the Reconstruction era

References

1864 births
1930 deaths
Republican Party members of the Tennessee House of Representatives
African-American state legislators in Tennessee
Politicians from Nashville, Tennessee
19th-century American politicians
20th-century African-American people